Lewis Wayne Williams (January 12, 1934 – September 1, 2019, born Chillicothe, Texas) was an American rockabilly singer and songwriter, known as the "Cab Calloway of rockabilly".

Williams began singing at age four, and moved with his family to Dallas at age eleven. He played in local clubs after graduating Adamson High School and entered Midwestern State University in 1952. However, a few months later he secured a job as a headliner for a radio program on Frederick, Oklahoma station KTAT.

The following year, Williams recorded demos at Jim Beck's recording studio and managed to get a single released on Flair Records in June 1953, but "I've Been Doin' Some Slippin' Too" was not a hit, and he did not release further material from these sessions. He sent some of the demos to Imperial Records, who offered him a publishing contract; Williams attempted to secure a recording contract as well but was unsuccessful initially. Imperial finally signed him as a recording artist in 1955, and his first releases came out in 1956. A few singles were issued in 1956 and 1957, with Jimmie Haskell producing and Barney Kessell on guitar; they did not sell and Williams was dropped early in 1957.

He graduated from the university in 1957 and devoted himself to songwriting full-time. After serving time in the Army, Williams took the pseudonym Vik Wayne for one final release on Dot Records, "The Girl I Saw on Bandstand"; when it did not sell, he opened a recording studio and started a talent agency. He left music for good in the early 1960s, moving into the publishing and mail order businesses.

After Bear Family Records released some of his material in the 1990s, fed by the burgeoning interest in rockabilly in Europe and Japan, he made a comeback, appearing in Las Vegas in 2000 and touring widely thereafter.

Lew Williams died at age 85 on September 1, 2019 at an assisted living facility in Winnsboro, Texas.

Discography

Singles

Albums 
 1999: Cat Talk
 2000: Teenager’s Talking On The Phone

References
[ Lew Williams] at Allmusic

Living people
1934 births
American rock songwriters
American rock singers
American rockabilly musicians
Singer-songwriters from Texas
People from Chillicothe, Texas
Midwestern State University alumni
Musicians from Dallas
Flair Records artists
Williams Lew
Dot Records artists
Country musicians from Texas
American male singer-songwriters